Andrew Yule & Co. Ltd. is an Indian central public sector undertaking under the ownership of the Ministry of Heavy Industries, Government of India. It is currently headquartered in Kolkata (formerly Calcutta), and has offices in the main Indian cities. The majority of the products and services offered by the cpsu's subsidiaries are related to heavy industry and engineering.

History
The business was founded by Andrew Yule in 1863 and incorporated as a private company in 1919. During British Raj the company was a large conglomerate. The company had varied and diversified business interests ranging from jute, cotton, coal, tea, engineering, electrical, power, chemicals, insurance, railways, shipping, paper, printing apart from maintaining a zamindari and managing house of several companies in India. The company was managed by Andrew Yule and his brother George Yule and later  by David Yule. The Bengal Coal Co was part of Andrew Yule group holding collieries in Bengal & Bihar. The company was turned into a public company in 1948, after India's independence from the British Empire. It became a central public sector enterprise (CPSE) (schedule B company) in 1979, after the Indian government completed a series of equity share acquisitions (49% in 1974 and 2% in 1979). As of 2011, the shareholders are the Indian government (97.46%), Financial Institutions (0.33%), and the remainder publicly traded (2.21%).

Ownership
Andrew Yule & Co. is a central public sector undertaking under the ownership of Ministry of Heavy Industries.

Engineering division
The engineering division is located in Kalyani, West Bengal, and produces industrial fans and blowers, air pollution control equipment, water treatment plants, heavy machinery, and engineering turnkey contracts.

Electrical division
The electrical division produces power and distribution transformers, high voltage switching gear, low voltage control gear, flame proof switch gear, voltage regulators and rectifiers, plant communication, and fire alarm and detection systems. The switchgear and electrical systems group is located in Kolkata, while the transformer & switchgear unit is located in Chennai.

Tea division
The tea division comprises fifteen tea estates, listed below. Five of these are in West Bengal and ten in Assam.
Mim Tea Estate in Darjeeling, West Bengal
Four tea estates clustered together near Banarhat town in the Dooars region of Northern West Bengal
Karbala Tea Estate
Banarhat Tea Estate
Choonabhutti Tea Estate and 
New Dooars Tea Estate 
Ten tea estates in Assam: 
Khowang, 
Bhamun, 
Hingrijan, 
Basmatia, 
Desam, 
Tinkong, 
Rajgarh, 
Hoolungoorie, 
Murphulani and 
Bogijan

Business development group
The business development group produces CAD & GIS applications, digitization, archiving, vectorization, and scanning of drawings, among other services.

Subsidiaries

Tide Water Oil Co. (India) Ltd.
This division produces lubricants and greases under the Veedol brand.
The cpsu currently owns 26.23% of Tide Water Oil Co. Ltd.

Descon Ltd.
Descon provided consultant services in the power and energy sector, engineering drawing, GIS, management consultancy, and software development. It was started its operation in the mid of 90's. Initially it was the stakeholder of DPSC or India Power. But after DPSC was taken over by SREI Group, Descon tied up with JSW Group. On 30 June 2014 Descon closed down its major operations as company was suffering from huge loss for last three years.

Webfil Ltd.
Webfil is a telecommunications provider, offering a digital micro radio telecommunication network, fibre optic communication systems, multiplexers and message switching systems, and telecommunication network services. Additionally it manufactures filaments for GLS lamps, and cathodes for fluorescent Lamps.

Yule Financing & Leasing Co.
This cpsu provides loan syndication, capital restructuring, financial re-engineering, management of insurance for medium-sized capital business units, and corporate advisory services.

Subsidiary companies

Hooghly Printing Co. Ltd.
This subsidiary provides multi-colour offset printing. It has regional offices in New Delhi, Mumbai and Chennai

See also
David Yule

References

External links
 The Yule Group

Government-owned companies of India
Companies based in Kolkata
Companies nationalised by the Government of India
Indian companies established in 1863
Engineering companies of India
Companies listed on the National Stock Exchange of India
Companies listed on the Bombay Stock Exchange

Indian companies established in 1919